Concrete is the second studio album by American country music singer Sunny Sweeney. It was released on August 23, 2011 via Republic Nashville. The album includes the singles "From a Table Away", "Staying's Worse Than Leaving" and "Drink Myself Single", all of which have charted within the top 40 of Hot Country Songs.

Reception

Commercial
The album debuted at #21 on the U.S. Billboard 200 chart upon its release. As of the chart dated September 24, 2011, the album has sold 26,418 copies in the US.

Critical
Matt Bjorke of Roughstock gave the album four-and-a-half stars out of five, calling it "traditional-minded yet thoroughly modern".

Track listing

Personnel
Credits adapted from AllMusic

Steve Brewster - drums
Mike Brignardello - bass guitar
Bob Britt - electric guitar
Nicole Broussard - background vocals
Jimmy Carter - bass guitar
J.T. Corenflos - electric guitar
Larry Franklin - fiddle
Mike Johnson - lap steel guitar
Greg Morrow - drums
Mike Rojas - accordion, Hammond B-3 organ, keyboards, piano
Scotty Sanders - dobro, steel guitar, lap steel guitar
Bryan Sutton - acoustic guitar
Sunny Sweeney - lead vocals
Russell Terrell - background vocals

Chart performance

Album

References

2011 albums
Republic Records albums
Sunny Sweeney albums
Albums produced by Brett Beavers